Qepchaq or Qopchaq may refer to:
 Qepchaq, Bostanabad, East Azerbaijan Province
 Qepchaq, Osku, East Azerbaijan Province
 Qepchaq, Hamadan
 Qepchaq, West Azerbaijan

See also
 Qebchaq (disambiguation)